Joel ibn Shu'aib (also "Shuiv") (15th century) was a rabbi, preacher, and commentator who was born in Aragon and lived also at Tudela. He wrote the following works: 
 Olat Shabbat, sermons, in the order of the Sabbatical sections, written in 1469 (Venice, 1577)
 A commentary on Lamentations, written at Tudela in 1480, and published together with Galante's commentary on the same book (ib. 1483)
 A commentary on Job, mentioned in his Olat Shabbat
 A short commentary on Shir HaShirim (1556)
 Nora Tehillot, a commentary on the Psalms, with a preface by his son Samuel (Salonica, 1568–1569).

Jewish Encyclopedia bibliography 
David Conforte, Ḳore ha-Dorot, p. 28a;
Giovanni Bernardo De Rossi-C. H. Hamberger, Hist. Wörterb. p. 291;
Moritz Steinschneider, Cat. Bodl. col. 1400;
Dukes, in Orient, Lit. ix. 302;
Graziadio Nepi-Mordecai Ghirondi, Toledot Gedole Yisrael, p. 162.

References 
 

15th-century Aragonese rabbis
15th-century Jewish biblical scholars